Galina Sidorova (born 6 March 1945) is a Soviet alpine skier. She competed at the 1964 Winter Olympics and the 1968 Winter Olympics.

References

External links
 

1945 births
Living people
Soviet female alpine skiers
Olympic alpine skiers of the Soviet Union
Alpine skiers at the 1964 Winter Olympics
Alpine skiers at the 1968 Winter Olympics
Skiers from Moscow